Federica Stabilini (born 2 December 1957) is an Italian former swimmer. She competed in three events at the 1972 Summer Olympics.

References

1957 births
Living people
Italian female swimmers
Olympic swimmers of Italy
Swimmers at the 1972 Summer Olympics
Swimmers from Rome